"Stack It Up" is a song by British singer Liam Payne featuring American rapper A Boogie wit da Hoodie, released on 18 September 2019 as the fifth single off Payne's debut studio album LP1. It was co-written by Ed Sheeran and produced by Steve Mac. It is Payne's first release as a solo lead artist since 2018's "First Time". Some radio stations played the no rap version of the song.

Promotion
Payne announced the song's release date and shared its cover art on social media on 10 September.

Track listing

Charts

Weekly charts

Year-end charts

Release history

References

2019 singles
2019 songs
Liam Payne songs
A Boogie wit da Hoodie songs
Songs written by Ed Sheeran
Songs written by Steve Mac
Song recordings produced by Steve Mac
Songs written by Fred Again
Songs written by A Boogie wit da Hoodie